In Greek mythology, Pitane (Ancient Greek: Πιτανη) was the Naiad-nymph of the spring, well or fountain of the town of Pitane (Laconia). She was the daughter of the river god Eurotas, became by Poseidon the mother of Evadne. The town of Pitane was named after her.

Note

References 

 Pindar, Odes translated by Diane Arnson Svarlien. 1990. Online version at the Perseus Digital Library.
 Pindar, The Odes of Pindar including the Principal Fragments with an Introduction and an English Translation by Sir John Sandys, Litt.D., FBA. Cambridge, MA., Harvard University Press; London, William Heinemann Ltd. 1937. Greek text available at the Perseus Digital Library.

Naiads
Nymphs
Children of Potamoi
Women of Poseidon
Laconian characters in Greek mythology
Laconian mythology